The Mercedes-Benz A-Class (W177) is the fourth and current generation of the A-Class range of subcompact executive hatchbacks and sedans. It was launched in 2018 as the successor to the W176 A-Class, with sales commencing in March 2018. The available body styles include:

 5-door hatchback (W177 model code)
 4-door sedan (V177 model code)
 4-door long wheelbase sedan (Z177, only sold in China)

Development and launch 
The W177 A-Class hatchback officially debuted at the 2018 Geneva Motor Show. It is based on the front-wheel drive MFA2 (Modular Front Architecture) platform and features front MacPherson struts, and rear torsion beam suspension, though some models are equipped with multi-link rear suspension. 

In mid-2020, the production of the North American-market A-Class sedan returned to Rastatt, Germany from the COMPAS plant in Aguascalientes, Mexico to increase the production capacity of the GLB.

The vehicle received a facelift for the 2023 model year.

Sedan (V177, Z177)
A 4-door sedan model was released in late 2018. The A-Class sedan is sold alongside the A-Class hatchback in Europe, while it marks the first time the A-Class is offered in North America but as a sedan only in the US and as both a hatchback and sedan in Canada and Mexico.

It is based on the Mercedes-Benz Concept A Sedan revealed at the 2017 Shanghai Motor Show and came in response to demand for a more practical alternative to the Mercedes-Benz CLA. A long-wheelbase sedan model (Z177) was also unveiled at the 2018 Auto China Show, featuring a  longer wheelbase and is sold exclusively in China.

At its debut Daimler claimed it had the lowest aerodynamic drag of all production vehicles in the world, with a drag area below 0.49 m2, depending on exact equipment, including aerodynamic wheel and tire combination, grille shutters, etc.

Equipment 
The W177 A-Class comes as standard with 16-inch alloy wheels, cruise control, keyless ignition, and LED daytime running lights.

All models feature the new Mercedes-Benz User Experience (MBUX) infotainment system with a redesigned touch interface and voice-controlled smart assistant that is activated by saying "Hey Mercedes". MBUX also contains what3words functionality as standard. It is also able to offer quick shortcuts to menus based on the past habits of the user. The system is also optionally available with an augmented reality navigation system that records and displays directional arrows on the road in the navigation system.

Standard models feature two 7-inch displays for the instrument cluster and MBUX screen, and can be upgraded to a 10.25-inch display with touchpad controls, real-time traffic information, and traffic sign recognition. Other available options include Apple CarPlay and Android Auto, ambient lighting, a head-up display, and the use of a smartphone to lock or unlock the car via NFC.

Mercedes-AMG A 35 4MATIC+, A 45 4MATIC+, and A 45 S 4MATIC+
The A 35 4MATIC+ model was unveiled at the 2018 Paris Motor Show. It uses an all-wheel drive layout and has a 7-speed dual clutch AMG SpeedShift DCT transmission.

On 2 January 2019, the automobile insurance company, HUK24, accidentally revealed the information about new A 45 4MATIC+ and A 45 S 4MATIC+ AMG in its website. The engine is heavily revised M133 and renamed M139 with higher compression ratio (9.0:1 versus 8.6:1 for M133 engine) and a twin-scroll turbocharger situated behind the engine for better air flow management.

Technical Details

Engines

Transmissions

Safety 
The 2018 A-Class scored five stars overall in its Euro NCAP test.

Awards 
 2018 AA Driven New Zealand 'Car of the Year'
 2019 What Car? 'Safety Award'
 2019 AutoTrader South African 'Car of the Year'
 2019 CarBuyer 'Best Small Luxury Car'

References

External links 

 

Euro NCAP small family cars
A-Class
Luxury vehicles
Cars introduced in 2018
2020s cars